Rameez Raja (born 31 July 1987) is a Pakistani first-class cricketer playing for Karachi. He is a right-hand batsman and right-arm offbreak bowler.

Career 
He played for the Pakistani U-19 cricket team at the 2006 U-19 Cricket World Cup.

In April 2018, he was named in Baluchistan's squad for the 2018 Pakistan Cup. He was the leading run-scorer for National Bank of Pakistan in the 2018–19 Quaid-e-Azam One Day Cup, with 449 runs in eight matches. In March 2019, he was named in Federal Areas' squad for the 2019 Pakistan Cup.

References

1987 births
Living people
Pakistani cricketers
Pakistan Twenty20 International cricketers
Karachi Blues cricketers
Karachi Dolphins cricketers
Fortune Barishal cricketers
Cricketers from Karachi
Karachi Zebras cricketers
National Bank of Pakistan cricketers
Pakistan Customs cricketers
Sindh cricketers
Quetta Gladiators cricketers